Brachyolene unicolor is a species of beetle in the family Cerambycidae. It was described by Stephan von Breuning in 1974. It is known from the Ivory Coast.

References

Endemic fauna of Ivory Coast
Tetraulaxini
Beetles described in 1974
Taxa named by Stephan von Breuning (entomologist)